Ciudad Constitución Airport  officially known as Aeropuerto Nacional Capitán Jaime Emilio Real Cossio (Captain Jaime Emilio Real Cossio National Airport) is a small airfield located  6 km east of the central business district (CBD) of Ciudad Constitución, Comondú Municipality of Baja California Sur state, Mexico. The city of Ciudad Constitución is located in the Santo Domingo Valley, in the middle of the state.

The airport handles both commercial and general aviation, mostly within the region.

The airport is operated by the Municipality of Comondú Government, but on October 9, 2007, the airline Aéreo Servicio Guerrero was authorized to use and manage the airport land and facilities.

Airlines and destinations

External links
 CUA at World Aerodata
 CUA at flightstats.com
 CUA at the Great Circle Mapper
 CUA Photo: Cessna on platform, in front of the airfield office.
 CUA old photo: DC3 arriving in 1986.

Airports in Baja California Sur
Comondú Municipality